This is a list of the 71 Members of Parliament (MPs) elected to the House of Commons of the United Kingdom by Scottish constituencies for the Forty-seventh parliament of the United Kingdom (Oct. 1974 to 1979) at the October 1974 United Kingdom general election.

Composition

List

By-elections 

 1978 Glasgow Garscadden By-election, Donald Dewar, Labour
1978 Hamilton By-election, George Robertson, Labour
1978 Berwick and East Lothian By-election, John Home Robertson, Labour

See also 

 Lists of MPs for constituencies in Scotland

Lists of UK MPs October 1974–1979
Lists of MPs for constituencies in Scotland
October 1974 United Kingdom general election